Kotakethana murders refer to a series of 18 mysterious murders of women, including three double murders, starting from 2008 in and around Kahawatte, Kotakethana, Dambulwala, Warapitiya, Opathawatte and nearby area in the Rathnapura district of Sri Lanka. The latest murder was reported on 28 September 2015 in Opathawatte in Kotakethana where a Tamil tea plantation worker woman was brutally hacked to death. The youngest victim was 19 years old and the eldest being 85. One 35-year-old male suspect was arrested on 11 December 2015 and his DNA matched with six murders.

Murders

Similarities 
All these killings have similarities which constitute several elements of systematic and extrajudicial killings. 

 The killings were of only women
 13 out of the 18 women were over 60 years of old
 All the killings were centered in a particular same area.
 Killings were conducted while the women were isolated or lived alone in their houses
 Many of the women were raped before they were killed 
 Many of the women were first killed then their dead bodies were burnt along with their houses. 
 In several killings, the bodies of the women were taken some distance away from their houses.
 Many of the killings showed clear evidence that the killings have been carried out by either two or more culprits.

Investigations and arrests
The police believe that all the murders may not be connected. 

On 11 December 2015, a 35-year-old suspect was arrested by police after several months of investigation by the CID. He is a resident of the same area. On 15 December 2015, the CID informed the Pelmadulla Magistrate that the DNA samples of the suspect matches DNA samples collected from the scenes of six of the seven murders in Kotakethana and Kahawatta.

See also
List of fugitives from justice who disappeared

References 

2008 murders in Sri Lanka
2010 murders in Sri Lanka
2011 murders in Sri Lanka
2012 murders in Sri Lanka
2014 murders in Sri Lanka
2015 murders in Sri Lanka
Female murder victims
Fugitives
History of Ratnapura District
People murdered in Sri Lanka
Sri Lankan murder victims
Sri Lankan serial killers
Unidentified serial killers
Violence against women in Sri Lanka